Thomas Sørensen (born 1 August 1984) is a retired Danish professional association football player. He played as a defender. He has previously represented  in the Danish Superliga.

References

External links

1984 births
Living people
Danish men's footballers
Association football defenders
Lyngby Boldklub players
Ølstykke FC players
Herfølge Boldklub players
Brønshøj Boldklub players
Akademisk Boldklub players
HB Køge players
Thomas Sorensen
Hvidovre IF players
Danish Superliga players
Danish 1st Division players
Footballers from Copenhagen